Events in the year 2019 in Morocco.

Incumbents
 King: Mohammed VI
 President of the Government: Saadeddine Othmani

Events

Sports
12 January – The 2019 Marrakesh ePrix, a Formula E electric car race, was held at the Circuit International Automobile Moulay El Hassan in the Agdal district of Marrakesh.

23 August to 3 September –   Scheduled date for the 2019 African Games, to be hosted in Casablanca and Rabat.

Deaths

1 January – , poet (b. 1955).

14 April – Abdallah Lamrani, footballer (b. 1946).

References

 
2010s in Morocco 
Years of the 21st century in Morocco 
Morocco 
Morocco